Pygospila tyres is a species of moth of the family Crambidae described by Pieter Cramer in 1780. It is found in the rainforests of south-east Asia, including Hong Kong, India, Thailand and Queensland in Australia.

Description
Palpi upturned, the 2nd joint broadly scaled in front, the 3rd porrect (extending forward) and lying on the hair of 2nd joint; maxillary palpi filiform and as long as the labial; frons rounded; antennae of male minutely ciliated; patagia extending beyond the metathorax; tibiae with the outer spurs half the length of the inner; abdomen long, male with the anal tuft large. Forewing with the costa arched towards apex; the outer margin oblique; the inner margin lobed before middle and somewhat excised towards outer angle; vein 3 from angle of cell; 4, 5 approximated for about one-third length; 7 curved and approximated to 8 and 9; 10 closely approximated to 8 and 9. Hindwing with the costa arched at middle; vein 2 from near angle of cell; 3 from the angle; 4 and 5 not approximated towards origin; 6 and 7 shortly stalked and curved, 7 anastomosing (fusing) slightly with 8.

The wingspan is about 40 mm.

References

External links

Spilomelinae
Moths of Japan
Insects of West Africa
Moths of Asia
Moths of Africa
Moths described in 1780